The 1.1"/75 caliber gun was an American anti-aircraft weapon of World War II, used by the United States Navy. The gun was designed to replace the M2 Browning and four barrels were required to duplicate the rate of fire. 

The first shipboard installation, in 1939, was quickly nicknamed the Chicago Piano, possibly because it was the size of a baby grand piano and looked a little like a baby grand without its lid. The name also references the "tommy guns" used by gangsters in Chicago, which were nicknamed "Chicago typewriters."

By 1941, these guns had been mounted on destroyers, cruisers, battleships, aircraft carriers, and some auxiliary ships. Nearly a thousand guns had been produced before production shifted to more reliable shipboard anti-aircraft machine guns in 1942. Quantities were minimal; one mount for a destroyer, two mounts for pre-1930s battleships, and four mounts for North Carolina–class and newer battleships. On at least some ships they were director-controlled.

The gun was very unpopular with its crews; it was said that due to its tendency to jam, the only way to fire one was to position a gunner's mate on his back underneath the mount, equipped with an assortment of wrenches and hammers to clear them. It was replaced by the  Oerlikon cannon or the  Bofors gun whenever possible, but served until the end of the war on some ships. A twin Bofors gun was about the same weight, and was a much more powerful gun. The air-cooled Oerlikon had similar effective range and rate of fire with considerably less weight. The Oerlikon could not sustain fire for as long as the water-cooled 1.1–inch, but six Oerlikons could be installed for the weight of a single 1.1–inch quad mount.

History 
The gun was based on patents of Richmond, Virginia, inventor Robert Hudson, who used a complicated gas-recoil operating system adapted to .30-06 Springfield and .50 BMG. The Navy's Bureau of Ordnance (BuOrd) had decided the M2 Browning was inadequate for future anti-aircraft duties, and modified Hudson's design for a new, high-velocity  cartridge. The water-cooled prototype was tested at Naval Surface Warfare Center Dahlgren Division in 1934:

Development proved difficult and the gun was not able to achieve its design goals in terms of accuracy and reliability and when finally available in quantity it was no longer deemed acceptable:

Before the Japanese struck Pearl Harbor on 7 December, five 1.1–inch quad mounts had been sent to the Cavite Navy Yard, in the Philippines, for fitting to the cruiser  of the Asiatic Fleet. Four were mounted on Houston and the fifth was a spare. To the surprise of most at Cavite, the one spare left on the dock survived the Japanese bombing. Since the mount was too heavy for the few harbor patrol vessels still stationed in Manila Bay, the fifth spare mount was put on a barge, along with 25,000 rounds of 1.1–inch ammunition, taken to Corregidor and "donated" to the US Army. There is no further record of what happened to the 1.1–inch mount sent to Corregidor.

Some online articles referring to this "donated to the Army" mount exist. One states the guns were installed in a special concrete mount and used successfully against Japanese airplanes until destroyed by gunfire.

The gun first saw action during the attack on Pearl Harbor. There are no records of which planes might have been hit by the large number of 1.1–inch rounds fired, but numerous accounts exist of damage caused by the impact-fuzed projectiles missing their targets and exploding like hand grenades when they returned to earth.

Preserved
The museum and park Freedom Park (Omaha, Nebraska) has a 1.1–inch quad mount on its grounds. One quad mount was at the Washington Navy Yard in the 1990s, and may still remain there. At least one quad mount still resides in storage with the battleship .

See also
List of anti-aircraft guns
List of artillery of the United States

Notes

References

Bibliography

External links

1.1"/75 (28 mm) Mark 1 and Mark 2 NavWeaps
BB North Carolina Scuttlebutt

28 mm artillery
Naval anti-aircraft guns
Anti-aircraft guns of the United States
1.1-inch
World War II artillery of the United States
World War II anti-aircraft guns
Military equipment introduced in the 1930s